Zimbabwe Electoral Commission (ZEC) is an independent Chapter 12 institution established in terms of Section 238 of the Constitution of Zimbabwe; which is responsible for the management and administration of Zimbabwe's electoral processes. It was initially established by the act of Parliament in 2004, with influence from its predecessor, the Electoral Supervisory Commission as well as the Southern African Development Community.

Official functions

The official functions of the Zimbabwe Electoral Commission are:
Preparing for, conducting and supervising all Elections in Zimbabwe and referendums.
Ensuring that elections are free, fair, transparent, and perfectly in accordance with the law. However ,that has not been always the case as some political stakeholders claim that the institution is biased and partisan.
Directing and controlling voter registration.
Gathering voters rolls and registers
Guarding and maintaining voters rolls and registers.
Designing and distributing ballot papers, setting up ballot boxes and placing polling stations.
Supervising the registration of voters under the Electoral Law
delimiting Electoral Boundaries.
Instructing the registrar general of voters of his functions under the law.
Instructing employees of the state or local authorities of their responsibilities in ensuring free, fair, proper, and fair conduct in any elections or referendums.   
Providing voter education which is:
accurate, adequate and not biased to any political party or candidate
in compliance with the Zimbabwe Electoral Commission Act
is not carried out by any foreign organisation of any kind (any local Zimbabwean person may be appointed to carry out voter education, although the materials used are approved by the ZEC, to ensure impartiality, uniformity and suitability.

Keeping the public informed about:
All candidates and affiliated political parties contesting an election, and supporting or opposing any question put to a referendum
Voting and the results of votes, and all matters concerning the work of the commission as well as the electoral process.
The exercise of any other function imposed on the commission by acts of parliament.

The Commission

The commission comprises eight commissioners who are appointed by the president. The chairperson is appointed after consultation with the judicial service commission, and the other seven are appointed from a list of nominees supplied by the Parliamentary Committee on Standing Rules and Orders. There is also a Chief Elections Officer charged with the day-to-day running of the commission.

Criticism

On numerous occasions the ZEC has been dubbed biased and their independence questioned by opposition parties as well as international Independent media.

Political violence and intimidation

Morgan Tsvangirai of the Movement for Democratic Change party believes that the June 2008 elections could not be conducted fairly due to election violence which Tsvangirai believes was state-sponsored, and in most cases performed by the state militia. He also claims that members of the police, Zimbabwe National Army, and prison officers were being "forced" to vote Zanu-PF. According to Tsvangirai the ZEC has failed to condemn whisperings among Zanu-PF officials that president Robert Mugabe will continue to rule regardless of electoral results, which has encouraged groups of War Veterans to provoke violence.

Media

MDC also claim that the Commission fails to conduct its duties of regulation efficiently as it has failed to act on the Zimbabwean media, such as the state-run Herald newspaper, which they are required to do in their mandate. Critics state that this information is completely one-sided against the opposition and in favour of Robert Mugabe and the incumbent Zanu-PF party, as well as being incorrect, and inciting racial, religious and political hatred, and blame the commission for failing to monitor this.

See also
International reaction to the 2008 Zimbabwean presidential election
2008 Zimbabwe presidential election
Campaigning for Zimbabwean presidential election, 2008
Second round of voting in the 2008 Zimbabwean presidential election

References

Zimbabwe
Elections in Zimbabwe